The Roman Catholic Diocese of Middlesbrough is a Latin Rite Roman Catholic diocese based in Middlesbrough, England and is part of the province of Liverpool. It was founded on 20 December 1878, with the splitting of the Diocese of Beverley which had covered all of Yorkshire. The Bishop's See is in Coulby Newham, Middlesbrough, at St Mary's Cathedral.

History

The diocese was created on 20 December 1878, when the then Diocese of Beverley, which covered the whole of Yorkshire, was divided into the Diocese of Middlesbrough, covering the North and East Ridings of Yorkshire and those parishes in the City of York to the north of the River Ouse, and the Diocese of Leeds, covering the West Riding of Yorkshire and those parishes in the City of York to the south of the River Ouse. In 1982 the two York parishes south of the River Ouse were ceded to the Diocese of Middlesbrough to unite the City of York under one bishop. The parish of Howden was transferred from Middlesbrough to the Leeds diocese in 2004.

Bishops

The Bishop of Middlesbrough is Terence Patrick Drainey. He was ordained as the 7th Bishop of Middlesbrough on 25 January 2008, replacing the Right Reverend John Patrick Crowley.

Ordinaries
See also Bishop of Middlesbrough.
Richard Lacy (1879-1929)
Thomas Shine (1929-1955), became Archbishop (personal title) in 1955 before he died
George Brunner (1956-1967)
John Gerard McClean (1967-1978)
Augustine Harris (1978-1992)
John Patrick Crowley (1992-2007)
Terence Patrick Drainey (2007- )

Coadjutor Bishops
Thomas Shine (1921-1929)
John Gerard McClean (1966-1967)
William Gordon Wheeler  (1964-1966), did not succeed to see; appointed Bishop of Leeds

Auxiliary Bishops
George Brunner (1946-1956), appointed Bishop here
Thomas Kevin O'Brien (1981-1998)

Other priest of this diocese who became bishop
Henry John Poskitt, appointed Bishop of Leeds in 1936

Parishes
Below is a list of the parishes and churches which fall within the Diocese of Middlesbrough, these are presented within the local vicariates:

Northern Vicariate
Patrons: Our Lady of Perpetual Help, Romuald, Bede and Luke Kirby
St Mary's Cathedral, Coulby Newham • Sacred Heart and St Patrick, Middlesbrough • St Joseph, Middlesbrough • St Thomas More, Middlesbrough • Holy Name of Mary, Middlesbrough • St Francis of Assisi, Middlesbrough • St Alphonsus, North Ormesby • St Gabriel, Ormesby • Corpus Christi, Middlesbrough • St Clare of Assisi, Middlesbrough • St Andrew's Parish, Teesville • St Pius X, Middlesbrough • St Bernadette's, Nunthorpe • St Joseph, Stokesley • St Mary, Crathorne • St Thérèse of Lisieux, Ingleby Barwick • St Patrick, Thornaby • Christ the King, Thornaby •  Ss Mary and Romuald, Yarm • Our Lady of Mount Grace, Osmotherley • Sacred Heart, Redcar • St Augustine, Redcar • St Bede, Marske-by-the-Sea • Our Lady of Lourdes, Saltburn • St Anthony of Padua, Brotton • St Paulinus, Guisborough • Ss Joseph & Cuthbert, Loftus • Sacred Heart, Northallerton • Ss Mary & Joseph, Bedale • All Saints, Thirsk • Ss Joseph & Francis Xavier, Richmond • Ss Peter & Paul, Leyburn • St Mary's, Wycliffe • Ss Simon and Jude, Ulshaw Bridge • St Bede, Catterick • Hawes  • St Joan of Arc, Catterick Garrison • St Margaret Clitherow, Great Ayton

Central Vicariate
Patron: St Hilda
York Oratory • St George's York • St Joseph, York • St Aelred, York • English Martyrs York • Our Lady, York • St Paulinus, York • St Joseph, Green Hammerton • St Margaret Clitherow, Haxby • University Chaplaincy Centre, York • Shrine of St Margaret Clitherow, York • St Bede's Pastoral Centre, York • Ss Mary & Everilda, Everingham • St Hilda (English Martyrs Sleights), Whitby • St Hedda, Egton Bridge • Our Lady of the Sacred Heart, Lealholm • St Anne, Ugthorpe • Our Lady Star of the Sea, Staithes • St Peter's, Scarborough • St Mary, Filey • Ss Leonard & Mary, Malton • St Joseph, Pickering • St Laurence's Abbey, Ampleforth • Our Lady and St Benedict, Ampleforth • Our Lady and the Holy Angels, Gilling East • St Aidan, Oswaldkirk • St Mary, Helmsley • St John the Evangelist, Easingwold • St Chad, Kirkbymoorside

Southern Vicariate
Patrons: Everilda and Willibrord
Ss Mary and Joseph, Pocklington • St John of Beverley, Beverley • Our Lady of Perpetual Help, Market Weighton • St John the Baptist, Holme-on-Spalding Moor • Our Lady & St Peter, Bridlington • Our Lady & St Edward, Driffield • Holy Cross, Cottingham • St Anthony and Our Lady of Mercy, Hull • Our Lady of Lourdes and St. Peter Chanel, Hull • St Charles Borromeo, Hull • St Joseph, Hull • Holy Name, Hull (closed c.2012) • St Vincent De Paul, Hull • Corpus Christi, Hull • St Wilfrid, Hull • Our Lady of Lourdes, Hessle • St Willibrord University Chaplaincy, Hull • Sacred Heart, Hull • St Bede, Hull • St Stephen, Hull • St Francis of Assisi, Hull • St Mary, Queen of Martyrs, Hull • Ss Mary & Joseph, Hedon • Sacred Heart, Hornsea • Ss Peter & John Fisher, Withernsea • Most Holy Sacrament, Marton

References

External links
Official Site
Diocesan Vocations Website
GCatholic.org

 
Religious organizations established in 1878
Christianity in Yorkshire
Roman Catholic dioceses and prelatures established in the 19th century
Roman Catholic Ecclesiastical Province of Liverpool